Kraśnik  is a town in southeastern Poland with 35,602 inhabitants (2012), situated in the Lublin Voivodeship, historic Lesser Poland. It is the seat of Kraśnik County. The town of Kraśnik as it is known today was created in 1975, after the merger of its two districts - Kraśnik Lubelski, and Kraśnik Fabryczny.

Location and districts

Kraśnik is located in Lesser Poland, among the hills of Lublin Upland, 49 kilometers south-west of Lublin. The town is divided into two major parts, which are a few kilometers apart: Kraśnik Fabryczny and Kraśnik Lubelski (or Kraśnik Stary, Old Kraśnik). The town has an area of 25.28 square kilometers, of which arable land makes up 45%, and forests 17%.

Kraśnik Lubelski
Kraśnik Lubelski is the original part of the town where all historic buildings are located. It is made of several districts, such as Old Town, Bojanówka, Koszary, Góry, Zarzecze, Kwiatkowice, and Osiedle Kolejowe. Kraśnik Lubelski has old churches and the oldest cemetery of the town, as well as a rail station, a bus station and main administrative offices of the county. It is also a major road junction, where future Expressway S19 (current National Road No. 19) meets National Road No. 74. Until 2010, the Road 74 went through the center of Kraśnik, but now there is a by-pass.

Kraśnik Fabryczny
Kraśnik Fabryczny was founded in the late 1930s, as a settlement for State Ammunition Factory No. 2 (Panstwowe Fabryka Amunicji nr. 2), one of the enterprises built as part of the Central Industrial Region. Previously, in the location of Kraśnik Fabryczny there was the village of Dąbrowa Bór, placed a few kilometers northwest of Kraśnik, in a forest between Kraśnik and Urzędów. The government of the Second Polish Republic planned a new settlement, built from scratch, for 6,000 people around the new Ammunition Factory No. 2, FLT-Kraśnik. After the war, the settlement of Dąbrowa Bór was expanded, and in 1954 its name was changed to Kraśnik Fabryczny. In the 1960s, a number of single-family houses was built, later on, several blocks of flats were constructed. On October 1, 1975, Kraśnik Fabryczny merged with Kraśnik Lubelski, and the villages of Budzyń and Piaski, creating the town of Kraśnik. Currently, Kraśnik Fabryczny has some 20,000 inhabitants.

History

The area of Kraśnik was first settled in the 13th century, and the town received its city charter in 1377, by King Louis I of Hungary. At that time it belonged to Sandomierz Voivodeship, one of two voivodeships of Lesser Poland (Lublin Voivodeship was created in 1474, out of parts of Sandomierz Voivodeship). Located on a busy merchant road from Silesia to Kyiv, Kraśnik in the 14th century belonged to the Gorajski family. In 1403, it had a parish church of Saint Paul, and in 1410, as a dowry of Anna of Goraj, it passed into the hands of the Tęczyński family. Later on, it belonged to other families, such as the Radziwiłłs, and in 1604, the town was purchased by hetman Jan Zamoyski. Until 1866, Kraśnik belonged to the Zamoyski family. The town frequently suffered from fires, it was also destroyed by the Swedes in 1657, during the Deluge.

Since the 14th century, Kraśnik was surrounded by a rampart, and ca. 1465, stone-brick walls were built on initiative of Jan Tęczyński, with two gates - Lublin Gate and Sandomierz Gate. The walls were demolished in the second half of the 19th century. Kraśnik also had a defensive church, surrounded with a high wall, and a castle, built in the 14th century on a hill surrounded by swamps. By 1646, the castle was already neglected. In 1657, it was completely destroyed by the Swedes.

Until the Third Partition of Poland (1795), Kraśnik belonged to Lublin Voivodeship, then passed into Austrian hands. In 1807 it was included in the short-lived Polish Duchy of Warsaw, and from 1815 until 1915 the town was in the Russian Empire (Congress Poland). In August 1914, the town and surrounding area were a focal point of Battle of Kraśnik, an opening battle of the World War I struggle between Russia and Central Powers over control of Galicia. During the war, the town gained its first railway connection, as a line was built through it by the Russians in 1914 in order to deliver supplies to the front. Later on, the line was expanded, and now it joins Lublin with Stalowa Wola.

In 1938 Kraśnik was selected as the location for an ammunition factory (see Central Industrial Region). The factory was not finished by the time World War II broke out in 1939, and during the German occupation it was used to manufacture parts for Heinkel planes and other purposes. After the war, in 1948, the factory was started up again, this time to produce ball bearings (the first factory to do that in Poland).

Jews in Kraśnik
As with much of the Lublin district, Kraśnik was a major center of Judaism, with 5,000 Jews (almost 50% of the population) prior to World War II. Historical accounts place Jews in the area in 1531, but the official right to settle there was granted to Jews in 1584. In 1654, Jewish residence was officially limited to the area near the synagogue, but in practice this was not rigidly enforced.Following the invasion of Poland by Nazi Germany and the Soviet Union in World War II, Kraśnik was taken over by the Soviets in 1939 and later by the Nazis during Operation Barbarossa. It was the site of the Budzyń concentration camp, where the prisoners worked for the Heinkel Flugzeugwerke factory on aircraft production. This camp, with around 3,000 Jews, became a subcamp of Majdanek. 
There was another labor camp in Kraśnik called the WIFO Labor Camp, or the Kraśnik Labor Camp (also called ZwangsArbeitslager Skret), located in the ghetto at Szkolna and Bóżnicza streets. It had a similar number of people in it (around 3,000), most of whom were murdered. From a population of more than 5,000 Kraśnik Jews, only an estimated 350 survived the Holocaust; most or all of these survivors left Poland.

Local attractions

Ruins of the 17th-century Zamoyski castle,
The 18th-century Baroque former Hospital Church of the Holy Spirit (1758–1761) and hospital,
The Lateran Canons, containing St Mary's Ascension church (ca 1469) with paintings by T. Dolabella, gravestones of the Teczynski family, and the monastery (15th-18th centuries),
An unusual double synagogue from the 17th century, partially renovated but now in disrepair
 2nd SOS Children's Village in Poland, established in 1991,
 Tsubaki-Hoover Polska Limited Liability Company, a subsidiary of Tsubaki Nakashima, which manufactures ball and roller bearings

Sports
Kraśnik has a sports club Stal, which was founded in 1948.

International relations

Twin towns
Kraśnik is twinned with:
  Hajdúböszörmény, Hungary
  Ruiselede, Belgium
  Šilalė, Lithuania
  Korosten, Ukraine
  Turiisk, Ukraine
  Trogir, Croatia

Former twin towns:
  Nogent-sur-Oise, France (In February 2020, the French commune suspended its partnership with Kraśnik as a reaction to the passing of an anti-LGBT resolution by the Kraśnik local authorities.)

Controversies

LGBT-free zone (2019-2021) 

In 2019, Kraśnik's city council has adopted an LGBT-free zone resolution, which led to the city's budget losing 10 million euros from EEA and Norway Grants, getting expelled from a European Union twin town cooperation program and losing twin town status with Nogent-sur-Oise. In 2021, an appeal to repeal the vote by the mayor was rejected by the town council.  The resolution was finally overturned on April 29, 2021.

5G-free zone

On 24 September 2020, Kraśnik councilors voted to consider the ban on 5G mobile telephony in the city. Support was given to the petition of the "Poland Free from 5G Coalition Association" (pl: Stowarzyszenie Koalicja Polska Wolna od 5G), which also provides for an order to dismantle Wi-Fi networks in schools.

See also
 Jelita Coat of Arms

References

External links
 Official home page
 Remember Jewish Krasnik
 Places in Lubelskie Kraśnik page, with pictures
 Compilation of Jewish family names appearing one or more times in the vital records of Kraśnik
 A list of those from the town of Kraśnik who were murdered in the Holocaust, taken from Sefer Krasnik (Book of Krasnik)
 Adam Mickiewicz Institute - Jewish History in Kraśnik
 

Cities and towns in Lublin Voivodeship
Kraśnik County
Lesser Poland
Lublin Governorate
Lublin Voivodeship (1919–1939)
Holocaust locations in Poland